, formerly known as , is a Japanese  manga magazine published by Kodansha, aimed at teenage girls. Bessatsu Friend is commonly known by the abbreviated name  and is published on the 13th of each month.

The magazine originally featured manga focused on romance; however, with the start of publications by manga artists like Keiko Suenobu, it began publishing such that moved away from that main focus.  publishes manga by many well known manga artists, such as Miwa Ueda, Satomi Ikezawa, Ayu Watanabe, Fuyumi Soryo, Nanba Atsuko, and Keiko Suenobu.

In October 2005, a manga serialized in Bessatsu Friend titled Flower of Eden was pulled from publication and recalled by both Kodansha and North American publisher Tokyopop, after it was revealed that the manga artist, Yuki Suetsugu, had copied art directly from Slam Dunk and Real by Takehiko Inoue. After that, official imports of Bessatsu Friend publications became scarce.


Serialization

Current
Hana-kun to Koisuru Watashi (2011–present)
A Girl & Her Guard Dog (2018–present)
Wotadol: Oshi ga Watashi de Watashi ga Oshi de (2019–present)
My Girlfriend's Child (2021–present)
 L DK Pink (2022–present)

Past

1977–1989
Akogare (1970)

1990–1999
Mars (1996–2000)
Peach Girl (1997–2004)
Guru Guru Pon-chan (1998–2000)
Girl Got Game (1999–2002)

2000–2009
Flower of Eden (2000–2004)
The Wallflower (2000–2015)
A Perfect Day for Love Letters (2001)
Othello (2001–2004)
My Heavenly Hockey Club (2002–2005)
Life (2002–2009)
Senpai to Kanojo (2004–2005)
Peach Girl: Sae's Story (2004–2008)
Love Attack! (2005–2009)
A Song to the Sun (2006)
Minima! (2006–2008)
Papillon (2007–2009)
Love's Reach (2008–2011)
Drowning Love (2009–2014)
L DK (2009–2017)

2010–2019
Kyō no Kira-kun (2012–2014)
P and JK (2013–2020)
Kiss Him, Not Me (2014–2019)
Defying Kurosaki-kun (2014–2021)
Kiss Me at the Stroke of Midnight (2015–2020)

Related magazines
 Nakayoshi
 Shojo Friend
 Dessert

References

External links
  
 

1965 establishments in Japan
Kodansha magazines
Magazines established in 1965
Magazines published in Tokyo
Monthly manga magazines published in Japan
Shōjo manga magazines